Jim Durham (February 12, 1947 – November 4, 2012) was an American sportscaster. Durham was born in Chicago, IL, and graduated from Donovan High School in Donovan, IL, and later attended Illinois State University in Normal, IL.

Career
Durham spent more than 37 years calling NBA games on TV and radio; his previous assignments were with the Chicago Bulls, the Dallas Mavericks, TNT and TBS. With the Bulls, he was the play-by-play announcer when Michael Jordan, Scottie Pippen, and their teammates won the 1991 NBA championship. In 1998, Durham called men's NCAA basketball tournament games for CBS.

Early career
Early in his career, Durham worked on WJBC radio in Bloomington, Illinois. During his time there, he covered the career of Illinois State University basketball star Doug Collins, later coincidentally the coach of the Bulls during the early Jordan years in Chicago, including the famous call listed below.

NBA career
Durham was the play-by-play voice of the Chicago Bulls from 1973 to 1991. During his first twelve years covering the ballclub, he was exclusively on the radio broadcasts on WIND (1973–1980, 1982–1985), WVON (1980–1982) and WGCI-FM (1981–1982; shared arrangement with WVON). Primarily working solo, he was paired with Norm Van Lier in 1980–81 and Dave Baum in 1982–83. For the remainder of his time in Chicago beginning with the 1985–86 season, he and Johnny Kerr handled the simulcast on WMAQ (1985–1988) and WLUP (1988–1991) on the radio and WFLD/SportsVision (1985–1989) and WGN/SportsChannel Chicago (1989–1991) on television. Five weeks after being relegated back to radio only on May 29, 1991, Durham was dismissed on July 3 as a result of a contract dispute with Bulls management. He was succeeded by Wayne Larrivee (WGN) and Tom Dore (SportsChannel) on television and Neil Funk on the radio.

Starting in 1995, he called numerous National Basketball Association games for ESPN and ESPN Radio.

The Shot
Durham's most memorable call was for "The Shot" made by Michael Jordan in Game 5 of the 1989 Eastern Conference First Round between the Bulls and Cavs:

Major League Baseball
Durham also did play-by-play for Major League Baseball, first in the 1980s for the Houston Astros, then from 1989–1990 for the Chicago White Sox and for ESPN Radio from 1998 until his death in 2012.

Death
Durham died on November 4, 2012  due to complications from a heart attack.

References

External links
 Jim Durham ESPN Bio

National Basketball Association broadcasters
People from Chicago
Chicago Bulls announcers
Durham Jim
Houston Astros announcers
Major League Baseball broadcasters
Dallas Mavericks announcers
National Football League announcers
Green Bay Packers announcers
Illinois State Redbirds basketball
1947 births
2012 deaths
College basketball announcers in the United States